Giuseppe Rizzi (20 January 1886 – 20 June 1960) was an Italian professional footballer, who played as a midfielder. He represented the Italy national football team four times, the first being Italy's first ever match on 15 May 1910, the occasion of a friendly match against France in a 6–2 home win, also scoring a goal.

External links 
Profile at MagliaRossonera.it 
Profile at Inter.it
International caps at FIGC.it 

1886 births
1960 deaths
Italian footballers
Italy international footballers
Association football midfielders
A.C. Milan players
Inter Milan players